Photorealism is a genre of art that encompasses painting, drawing and other graphic media, in which an artist studies a photograph and then attempts to reproduce the image as realistically as possible in another medium. Although the term can be used broadly to describe artworks in many different media, it is also used to refer specifically to a group of paintings and painters of the American art movement that began in the late 1960s and early 1970s.

History

Origins
As a full-fledged art movement, Photorealism evolved from Pop Art and as a counter to Abstract Expressionism as well as Minimalist art movements in the late 1960s and early 1970s in the United States.  Photorealists use a photograph or several photographs to gather the information to create their paintings and it can be argued that the use of a camera and photographs is an acceptance of Modernism. However, the admittance to the use of photographs in Photorealism was met with intense criticism when the movement began to gain momentum in the late 1960s, despite the fact that visual devices had been used since the fifteenth century to aid artists with their work.

Louis K. Meisel states in his books and lectures the following: The invention of photography in the nineteenth century had three effects on art: portrait and scenic artists were deemed inferior to the photograph and many turned to photography as careers; within nineteenth- and twentieth-century art movements it is well documented that artists used the photograph as source material and as an aid—however, they went to great lengths to deny the fact fearing that their work would be misunderstood as imitations; and through the photograph's invention artists were open to a great deal of new experimentation.  Thus, the culmination of the invention of the photograph was a break in art's history towards the challenge facing the artist—since the earliest known cave drawings—trying to replicate the scenes they viewed.

By the time the Photorealists began producing their bodies of work the photograph had become the leading means of reproducing reality and abstraction was the focus of the art world.  Realism continued as an ongoing art movement, even experiencing a reemergence in the 1930s, but by the 1950s modernist critics and Abstract Expressionism had minimalized realism as a serious art undertaking.  Though Photorealists share some aspects of American realists, such as Edward Hopper, they tried to set themselves as much apart from traditional realists as they did Abstract Expressionists.  Photorealists were much more influenced by the work of Pop artists and were reacting against Abstract Expressionism.

Pop Art and photorealism were both reactionary movements stemming from the ever-increasing and overwhelming abundance of photographic media, which by the mid 20th century had grown into such a massive phenomenon that it was threatening to lessen the value of imagery in art.  However, whereas the Pop artists were primarily pointing out the absurdity of much of the imagery (especially in commercial usage), the Photorealists were trying to reclaim and exalt the value of an image.

The association of photorealism with trompe-l'œil is a wrongly attributed comparison, an error in observation or interpretation made by many critics of the 1970s and 1980s.  Trompe-l'œil paintings attempt to "fool the eye" and make the viewer think he is seeing an actual object, not a painted one. When observing a Photorealist painting, the viewer is always aware that they are looking at a painting.

Definition
The word Photorealism was coined by Louis K. Meisel in 1969 and appeared in print for the first time in 1970 in a Whitney Museum catalogue for the show "Twenty-two Realists."  It is also sometimes labeled as Super-Realism, New Realism, Sharp Focus Realism, or Hyper-Realism.

Louis K. Meisel, two years later, developed a five-point definition at the request of Stuart M. Speiser, who had commissioned a large collection of works by the Photorealists, which later developed into a traveling show known as 'Photo-Realism 1973: The Stuart M. Speiser Collection', which was donated to the Smithsonian in 1978 and is shown in several of its museums as well as traveling under the auspices of 'site'.  The definition for the 'originators' was as follows:
  The Photo-Realist uses the camera and photograph to gather information.
 The Photo-Realist uses a mechanical or semi-mechanical means to transfer the information to the canvas.
  The Photo-Realist must have the technical ability to make the finished work appear photographic.
  The artist must have exhibited work as a Photo-Realist by 1972 to be considered one of the central Photo-Realists.
  The artist must have devoted at least five years to the development and exhibition of Photo-Realist work.

Styles
Photorealist painting cannot exist without the photograph.  In Photorealism, change and movement must be frozen in time which must then be accurately represented by the artist.  Photorealists gather their imagery and information with the camera and photograph. Once the photograph is developed (usually onto a photographic slide) the artist will systematically transfer the image from the photographic slide onto canvases.  Usually this is done either by projecting the slide onto the canvas or by using traditional grid techniques.  The resulting images are often direct copies of the original photograph but are usually larger than the original photograph or slide.  This results in the photorealist style being tight and precise, often with an emphasis on imagery that requires a high level of technical prowess and virtuosity to simulate, such as reflections in specular surfaces and the geometric rigor of man-made environs.

Artists
The first generation of American Photorealists includes the painters Richard Estes, Ralph Goings, Chuck Close, Charles Bell, Audrey Flack, Don Eddy, Robert Bechtle, Ron Kleemann, Richard McLean, John Salt, and Tom Blackwell.  Often working independently of each other and with widely different starting points, these original Photorealists routinely tackled mundane or familiar subjects in traditional art genres--landscapes (mostly urban rather than naturalistic), portraits, and still lifes. 

With the birth of the Photorealist movement, many painters who were related to Photorealism, continued to pursue and refine their techniques; they became the second generation of Photorealists. These painters included John Baeder, Hilo Chen, Jack Mendenhall, David Parrish and Idelle Weber.

In the United Kingdom of Great Britain and Northern Ireland, photorealist approaches were favoured by many artists including Mike Gorman and Eric Scott. The introduction of these European painters to a wider US audience was brought about through the 1982 'Superhumanism' exhibition at the Arnold Katzen Gallery, New York.

Though the movement is primarily associated with painting, Duane Hanson and John DeAndrea are sculptors associated with photorealism for their painted, lifelike sculptures of average people that were complete with simulated hair and real clothes. They are called Verists.

Since 2000

Though the height of Photorealism was in the 1970s, the movement continues and includes several of the original photorealists as well as many of their contemporaries.  According to Meisel and Chase's Photorealism at the Millennium, only eight of the original thirteen photorealists were still creating Photorealist work in 2002.  As of September 2020, Richard Estes  is the only remaining original Photorealist actively working in the Photorealist style. 

Artists Robert Bechtle, Charles Bell, Tom Blackwell, Ralph Goings, John Kacere, Ron Kleemann have died; Audrey Flack, Chuck Close, Don Eddy, and  have moved away from Photorealism; and Robert Cottingham no longer considers himself a photorealist.

Newer Photorealists are building upon the foundations set by the original Photorealists.  Examples would be the influence of Richard Estes in works by Anthony Brunelli or the influence of Ralph Goings and Charles Bell in works by Glennray Tutor. However, this has led many to move on from the strict definition of photorealism as the emulation of the photograph.  Photorealism is also no longer simply an American art movement. Starting with Franz Gertsch in the 1980s Clive Head, Raphaella Spence, Bertrand Meniel, and Roberto Bernardi are several European artists associated with photorealism that have emerged since the mid-1990s. This internationalization of photorealism is also seen in photorealist events, such as The Prague Project, in which American and non-American photorealist painters have traveled together to locations including Prague, Zurich, Monaco and New York, to work alongside each other in producing work.

The evolution of technology has brought forth photorealistic paintings that exceed what was thought possible with paintings; these newer paintings by the photorealists are sometimes referred to as "Hyperrealism."  With new technology in cameras and digital equipment, artists are able to be far more precision-oriented and can produce imagery using a wider range of media.  The artist Bill Fink has developed his own technique for creating photorealistic images using soil, pollen, human hair, and cremated human remains.

Photorealism's influence and popularity continues to grow, with new books such as Juxtapoz's 2014 book entitled Hyperreal detailing current trends within the artistic genre.

List of photorealists
Original photorealists
Significant artists whose work helped define Photorealism:

John Baeder (born 1938)
Robert Bechtle (1932–2020)
Charles Bell (1935–1995)
Tom Blackwell (1938–2020)
Chuck Close (1940–2021)
Robert Cottingham (born 1935)
Don Eddy (born 1944)
Richard Estes (born 1932)
Audrey Flack (born 1931)
Ralph Goings (1928–2016)
Ian Hornak (1944–2002)
Howard Kanovitz (1929–2009)
John Kacere (1920–1999)
Ron Kleemann (1937–2014)
Malcolm Morley (1931–2018)
John Salt (born 1937)
Ben Schonzeit (born 1942)

Photorealists
Significant artists whose work meets the criteria of Photorealism:

Linda Bacon
Mike Bayne
Roberto Bernardi (born 1974) 
Arne Besser
Anthony Brunelli (born 1968)
Bryan Charnley (1949–1991)
Hilo Chen (born 1942)
Davis Cone (born 1950)
Randy Dudley (born 1950)
Franz Gertsch (born 1930)
Robert Gniewek (born 1951)
Gus Heinze (born 1926)
Gottfried Helnwein (born 1948)
Don Jacot (born 1949)
Noel Mahaffey (born 1944)
Dennis James Martin (1956–2001)
Jack Mendenhall (born 1937)
Kim Mendenhall
Betrand Meniel (born 1961)
Reynard Milici (born 1942)
Robert Neffson (born 1949)
William Nichols (born 1942) 
Jerry Ott (born 1947)
James Torlakson (born 1951)
Denis Peterson
Tjalf Sparnaay (born 1954)
Paul Staiger (born 1941)
Glennray Tutor (born 1950)
Rod Penner (born 1965)
Raphaella Spence (born 1978)
Idelle Weber (1932–2020)

Other photorealists
Clive Head (born 1965)

See also

 Abstract Illusionism
 Contemporary art
 Contemporary realism
 History of art
 Hyperrealism (visual arts)
 Photorealistic rendering
 Realism (arts)
 Trompe-l'œil
 Art of Europe
 Western painting

References

Bibliography

 Auping, Michael; Bishop, Janet; Ray, Charles; and Weinberg, Jonathan (2005), Robert Bechtle: A Retrospective. Berkeley, California: University of California Press. .
 Chalumeau, Jean-Luc (2007), Peinture et Photographie: Pop art, figuration narrative, hyperréalisme, nouveaux pop. Paris: Editions du Chêne.  .
 Chase, Linda (1988), Ralph Goings: Essay/Interview. New York: Abrams.  .
 Chase, Linda (ed.) (2001), Photorealism: The Liff Collection. Naples, Florida: Naples Museum of Art.  .
 Geldzahler, Henry and Meisel, Louis K. (1991), Charles Bell: The Complete Works, 1970–1990. New York: Abrams. .
 Lindey, Christine (1980), Superrealist Painting and Sculpture, New York: William Morrow and Company. 
 Meisel, Louis K. (1989), Photorealism. New York: Abradale/Abrams.  .
 Meisel, Louis K. (1993), Photorealism Since 1980. New York: Abrams. .
 Meisel, Louis K. and Chase, Linda. (2002), Photorealism at the Millennium. New York: Abrams. .
 Meisel, Louis K. and Perreault, John (1986), Richard Estes: The Complete Paintings, 1966-1985. New York:Abrams. .
 Paraskos, Michael (2013), Scarborough Realists Now. London: Orage Press. .
 Paraskos, Michael (2010), Clive Head. London: Lund Humphries. .
 Wilmerding, John (2006), Richard Estes. New York: Rizzoli. .

External links
 

 
Art movements
American art movements
Contemporary art movements
Modern paintings